General elections were held in Uruguay on 25 November 1928. The various factions of the Colorado Party received the most votes in the elections for the National Administration Council, whilst the National Party and its sister party the Radical White Party won the most seats in the Chamber of Deputies.

Results

National Administration Council

Chamber of Deputies

References

Elections in Uruguay
Uruguay
General
Uruguay
Election and referendum articles with incomplete results